Mordovsky District is an administrative and municipal district (raion), one of the twenty-three in Tambov Oblast, Russia. It is located in the southwest of the oblast. The district borders with Petrovsky District in the north, Tokaryovsky District in the east, and Dobrinsky District of Lipetsk Oblast in the south and west. Its administrative center is the urban locality (a work settlement) of Mordovo. Population: 19,375 (2010 Census);  The population of Mordovo accounts for 33.7% of the district's total population.

References

Notes

Sources

Districts of Tambov Oblast